Luen Yick Fishermen Village is a village in Yim Tin Tsai, Tai Po District, Hong Kong.

Administration
Luen Yick Fishermen Village is one of the villages represented within the Tai Po Rural Committee. For electoral purposes, Luen Yick Fishermen Village is part of the Shuen Wan constituency, which was formerly represented by So Tat-leung until October 2021.

See also
 Fishermen villages in Hong Kong

References

Villages in Tai Po District, Hong Kong